Dagana is one of three departments in Hadjer-Lamis, a region of Chad. Its capital is Massakory.

Subdivisions 
Dagana is divided into four sub-prefectures:

 Massakory ;
 Tourba ;
 Karal.

References

Departments of Chad
Hadjer-Lamis Region